Yang Xi (late 200s - 261), courtesy name Wenran, was an official of the state of Shu Han during the Three Kingdoms period of China. He is best known for writing the Ji Han Fuchen Zan (季漢輔臣贊; pub. 241), a collection of praises of notable persons who served in the Shu Han state. Chen Shou, the third-century historian who wrote the Records of the Three Kingdoms (Sanguozhi), extensively quoted and annotated Yang Xi's collection.

Life
Yang Xi was from Wuyang County (武陽縣), Qianwei Commandery (犍為郡), which is present-day Pengshan District, Meishan, Sichuan.

At a young age, Yang Xi was already quite well known in Shu. His fame put him on par with others such as Cheng Qi from Baxi Commandery, Yang Tai (楊汰) from Ba Commandery, and Zhang Biao from Shu Commandery. Yang Xi also often praised Cheng Qi as the most brilliant among the four of them. Zhuge Liang, the Imperial Chancellor of Shu, recognised and appreciated their talents.

When Yang Xi was in his 20s, he started his career as a scribe in the administrative office of Yi Province (covering present-day Sichuan and Chongqing) before rising to the position of a junior judicial officer. While in office, he reviewed and cleared difficult cases and earned praise from his colleagues for his appropriate handling of cases. He was later promoted to serve as Chief Clerk (主簿) in the Imperial Chancellor's office under Zhuge Liang.

Following Zhuge Liang's death in 234, Yang Xi became an official in the selection bureau of the imperial secretariat. Later, he became an assistant officer in the headquarters office (治中從事) under Jiang Wan, who was then the Inspector of Yi Province. After Jiang Wan rose to the position of General-in-Chief (大將軍), he reassigned Yang Xi to be an official in the east bureau of his office. Yang Xi later consecutively served as an army adviser (參軍) to the General of the Household of the South (南中郎將), an assistant to the Area Commander of Laixiang (庲降都督), and Administrator (太守) of Jianning Commandery (建寧郡; covering parts of present-day Yunnan and Guizhou).

Some time later, due to poor health, Yang Xi quit his post at Jianning Commandery and returned to the Shu capital Chengdu, where he served as Army Supervisor Who Protects the Army (護軍監軍) until he recovered. He was then appointed as the Administrator of Zitong Commandery (梓潼郡; around present-day Zitong County, Sichuan), and later recalled back to Chengdu again to serve as Colonel of Trainee Archers (射聲校尉). While he was in office, Yang Xi gained a reputation for maintaining an honest, prudent, simple and minimalist approach towards performing his duties.

In 257, Yang Xi accompanied the Shu general Jiang Wei on a military campaign against Shu's rival state, Wei, and participated in the battle against Wei forces at Mangshui (芒水; southeast of present-day Zhouzhi County, Shaanxi). Yang Xi had all along been sceptical and suspicious of Jiang Wei. When he got drunk, he often cracked jokes and poked fun at Jiang Wei.

Although Jiang Wei appeared to tolerate Yang Xi for ridiculing him, he actually bore a grudge against Yang Xi and wanted to get back at him. After the Shu army returned from the campaign, someone reported Yang Xi to the Shu imperial court for his disrespectful behaviour. As a result, Yang Xi was removed from office and reduced to the status of a commoner. Yang Xi died a few years later in 261.

Appraisal
Apart from his simple and minimalist approach towards work, Yang Xi was also known for being curt and terse when he spoke to others. He neither tried to be tactful with his words nor exchanged pleasantries and gifts with his colleagues. When he wrote letters and documents, he rarely wrote beyond one piece of paper. However, he maintained close ties with his friends, and was known for treating people with sincerity and kindness.

Yang Xi was a close childhood friend of Han Yan (韓儼) and Li Tao (黎韬), who were from Baxi Commandery. After they grew up, only Yang Xi made it to a career in the government. Han Yan could not serve because of his poor health while Li Tao, who initially made it too, was later dismissed from office for misconduct. Despite what happened to them, Yang Xi still treated them like his close friends and even provided them financial aid and helped them in their daily lives.

Around the time, many people said that the Shu official Qiao Zhou lacked talent and did not respect him much. Only Yang Xi regarded Qiao Zhou highly. He even once said: "Like us, the later generations can never be as good as this great man." Because of this, Yang Xi earned praise from others who also recognised Qiao Zhou for his talent.

Ji Han Fuchen Zan
In 241, Yang Xi wrote the Ji Han Fuchen Zan (季漢輔臣贊; pub. 241), a collection of praises of notable persons who served in Shu. Chen Shou, the third-century historian who wrote the Records of the Three Kingdoms (Sanguozhi), extensively quoted and annotated Yang Xi's collection.

As the Ji Han Fuchen Zan was written in 241, it did not contain information about notable persons from Shu who died after that year. When he was writing Yang Xi's biography in the Sanguozhi, Chen Shou added information on the notable persons who died after 241 at the end of the Ji Han Fuchen Zan so as to allow readers to have a rough understanding of these persons' lives.

A list of persons whom Yang Xi praised in his Ji Han Fuchen Zan (in order of mention):

 Liu Bei
 Zhuge Liang
 Xu Jing
 Guan Yu
 Zhang Fei
 Ma Chao
 Fa Zheng
 Pang Tong
 Huang Zhong
 Dong He
 Deng Fang
 Fei Guan
 Wang Lian
 Liu Ba
 Mi Zhu
 Wang Mou
 He Zong
 Du Wei
 Zhou Qun
 Wu Yi
 Li Hui
 Zhang Yi
 Huang Quan
 Yang Hong
 Zhao Yun
 Chen Dao
 Fu Kuang
 Liu Yong
 Qin Mi
 Li Yan
 Wei Yan
 Yang Yi
 Ma Liang
 Wei Wenjing
 Han Shiyuan
 Zhang Cun
 Yin Guan
 Xi Zhen
 Wang Fu
 Li Shao
 Ma Xun
 Ma Qi
 Li Fu
 Li Chao
 Gong Lu
 Wang Shi
 Feng Xi
 Zhang Nan
 Cheng Ji
 Cheng Qi
 Mi Fang
 Shi Ren
 Hao Pu
 Pan Jun

See also
 Lists of people of the Three Kingdoms

Notes

References

 Chen, Shou (3rd century). Records of the Three Kingdoms (Sanguozhi).
 Chang Qu (4th century). Chronicles of Huayang (Huayang Guo Zhi).
 
 Pei, Songzhi (5th century). Annotations to Records of the Three Kingdoms (Sanguozhi zhu).
 

Year of birth unknown
261 deaths
Shu Han politicians
Politicians from Meishan